General elections were held in Cuba on 1 November 1924. Gerardo Machado won the presidential election running under the Liberal–Popular Coalition banner, whilst the coalition also emerged as the largest faction in the House of Representatives, winning 31 of the 53 seats. Following the elections, which were deemed to be fraudulent, Machado established a dictatorship that lasted until he was overthrown in 1933.

Results

President

Senate

House of Representatives

References

Cuba
General
Presidential elections in Cuba
Parliamentary elections in Cuba
Cuba
Election and referendum articles with incomplete results